The 2016 World Team Table Tennis Championships was held in Shah Alam, Selangor, Malaysia from 28 February to 6 March 2016.

Seeding
The top sixteen teams of the first division and the top two teams of the second division at the 2014 World Team Championships were guaranteed a place in the first division, along with the top six placed teams in the world rankings not already qualified.

Schedule
Five individual events were contested. Qualification rounds were held from 26–27 April.

Medal summary

Medal table

Medalists

Results

Men's team

Women's team

See also
2016 ITTF World Tour
2016 ITTF World Tour Grand Finals
Table tennis at the 2016 Summer Olympics

References

External links
Official website
ITTF website

 
2016
2016 in Malaysian sport
Sport in Selangor
2016 in table tennis
International sports competitions hosted by Malaysia
Table tennis competitions in Malaysia
February 2016 sports events in Asia
March 2016 sports events in Asia